Oliver Burgess Meredith (November 16, 1907 – September 9, 1997) was an American actor and filmmaker whose career encompassed theater, film, and television.

Active for more than six decades, Meredith has been called "a virtuosic actor" and "one of the most accomplished actors of the century". A lifetime member of the Actors Studio, he won several Emmys, was the first male actor to win the Saturn Award for Best Supporting Actor twice, and was nominated for two Academy Awards.

He established himself as a leading man in Hollywood with critically acclaimed performances as Mio Romagna in Winterset (1936), George Milton in Of Mice and Men (1939), and Ernie Pyle in The Story of G.I. Joe (1945).

Meredith was known later in his career for his appearances on The Twilight Zone and for portraying The Penguin in the 1960s TV series Batman and boxing trainer Mickey Goldmill in the Rocky film series. For his performances in The Day of the Locust (1975) and Rocky (1976), he received nominations for the Academy Award for Best Supporting Actor. He later appeared in the comedy Foul Play (1978) and the fantasy film Clash of the Titans (1981). He narrated numerous films and documentaries during his long career.

"Although those performances renewed his popularity," observed Mel Gussow in The New York Times, "they represented only a small part of a richly varied career in which he played many of the more demanding roles in classical and contemporary theater—in plays by Shakespeare, O'Neill, Beckett and others."

Early life
Meredith was born in 1907 in Cleveland, Ohio, the son of Ida Beth (née Burgess; 1861–1933) and Dr. William George Meredith (1861–1938), a Canadian-born physician of English descent. His mother came from a long line of Methodist revivalists, a religion to which he adhered throughout his lifetime.
He graduated from Hoosac School in 1926 and then attended Amherst College (class of 1931). He left Amherst and became a reporter for the Stamford Advocate.

Career

Theatre

In 1929, he became a member of Eva Le Gallienne's Civic Repertory Theatre company in New York City. Although best known to the larger world audience for his film and television work, Meredith was an influential actor and director for the stage. He made his Broadway debut as Peter in Le Gallienne's production of Romeo and Juliet (1930) and became a star in Maxwell Anderson's Winterset (1935), which became his film debut the following year. His early life and theatre work were the subject of a New Yorker profile. In 1935, he starred along with Hugh Williams at the Martin Beck Theatre in John Van Druten's Flowers of the Forest.

He garnered critical acclaim in the 1935 Broadway revival of The Barretts of Wimpole Street starring Katharine Cornell. She subsequently cast him in several of her later productions. Other Broadway roles included Van van Dorn in High Tor (1937), Liliom in Liliom (1940), Christy Mahon in The Playboy of the Western World (1946), and Adolphus Cusins in Major Barbara (1956). He created the role of Erie Smith in the English-language premiere of Eugene O'Neill's Hughie at the Theater Royal in Bath, England in 1963. He played Hamlet in avant garde theatrical and radio productions of the play.

A distinguished theatre director, he earned a Tony Award nomination for his 1974 Broadway staging of Ulysses in Nighttown, a theatrical adaptation of the "Nighttown" section of James Joyce's Ulysses. Meredith also shared a Special Tony Award with James Thurber for their collaboration on A Thurber Carnival (1960). In the late seventies, he directed Fionnula Flanagan's one-woman multi-role play James Joyce's Women, which toured for several years.

Cinema

Early in his career, Meredith attracted favorable attention, especially for playing George in a 1939 adaptation of John Steinbeck's Of Mice and Men and as war correspondent Ernie Pyle in The Story of G.I. Joe (1945). He was featured in many 1940s films, including three—Second Chorus (1940), Diary of a Chambermaid (1946), and On Our Merry Way (1948) — co-starring his then-wife Paulette Goddard. As a result of the House Committee on Un-American Activities  investigation, Meredith was placed on the Hollywood blacklist and was largely absent from film for the next decade, though he remained involved in stage plays and radio during this time.

Meredith was a favorite of director Otto Preminger, who cast him in Advise and Consent (1962), The Cardinal (1963), In Harm's Way (1965), Hurry Sundown (1967), Skidoo (1968), and Such Good Friends (1971). He was in Madame X (with Lana Turner, 1966) and Stay Away Joe (1968), appearing as the father of Elvis Presley's character. He was acclaimed by critics for his performance as Harry Greener in The Day of the Locust (1975) and received nominations for the BAFTA, Golden Globe, and Academy Award for best supporting actor. Meredith then played Rocky Balboa's trainer Mickey Goldmill in the first three Rocky films (1976, 1979, and 1982). Though his character died in the third Rocky film, he returned briefly in a flashback in the fifth film, Rocky V (1990). His portrayal in the first film earned him his second consecutive nomination for the Academy Award for Best Supporting Actor.

Meredith played an old Korean War veteran Captain J. G. Williams in The Last Chase (1981) with Lee Majors. He appeared in Ray Harryhausen's last stop-motion feature Clash of the Titans (also 1981) in a supporting role. Meredith appeared in Santa Claus: The Movie (1985) and was a voice actor in G.I. Joe: The Movie (1989). In his last years, he played Jack Lemmon's character's sex-crazed 95-year-old father in Grumpy Old Men (1993) and its sequel, Grumpier Old Men (1995).

Meredith directed the movie The Man on the Eiffel Tower (1949) starring Charles Laughton, which was produced by Irving Allen. Meredith also was billed in a supporting role in this film. In 1970, he directed (as well as co-wrote and played a supporting role in) The Yin and the Yang of Mr. Go, an espionage caper starring James Mason and Jeff Bridges.

Television

Meredith appeared in four different starring roles in the anthology TV series The Twilight Zone, tying him with Jack Klugman for the most appearances on the show in a starring role.

In his first appearance in 1959, "Time Enough at Last", he portrayed a henpecked bookworm who finds himself the sole survivor of an unspecified apocalypse which leads him to contemplate suicide until he discovers the ruins of the library. In 1961's "Mr. Dingle, the Strong", Meredith played the title character, a timid weakling who receives superhuman strength from an extraterrestrial experiment in human nature. Also that year in "The Obsolete Man", Meredith portrayed a librarian sentenced to death in a dystopic totalitarian society. Lastly, in 1963's "Printer's Devil", Meredith portrayed the Devil himself. He later played two additional roles in Rod Serling's other anthology series, Night Gallery. Meredith was the narrator for Twilight Zone: The Movie in 1983.

He appeared in various other television programs, including the role of Christopher Norbert III, in the 1962 episode "Hooray, Hooray, the Circus Is Coming to Town" of the NBC medical drama about psychiatry, The Eleventh Hour, starring Wendell Corey and Jack Ging. He also guest starred in the ABC drama about psychiatry, Breaking Point, in the 1963 episode titled "Heart of Marble, Body of Stone".

Meredith appeared in various western series, such as Rawhide (four times), The Virginian (twice), Wagon Train, Branded, The Wild Wild West, The Travels of Jaimie McPheeters, Laredo, Bonanza, and Daniel Boone. In 1963, he appeared as Vincent Marion in a five-part episode of the last season of the Warner Bros. ABC detective series 77 Sunset Strip. He appeared three times in Burke's Law (1963–1964), starring Gene Barry.

Meredith was also well known for his portrayal  of the Penguin in the television series Batman from 1966 to 1968 and in the 1966 film based on the TV series. His role as the Penguin was so well-received that the show's writers always had a script featuring the Penguin ready whenever Meredith was available. Meredith made 21 appearances on the series as the Penguin. He also made a brief cameo appearance as the Penguin in the 1968 episode of The Monkees titled "Monkees Blow Their Minds".

From 1972 to 1973, Meredith played V. C. R. Cameron, director of Probe Control, in the television movie/pilot Probe and then in Search, the subsequent TV series (the name was changed to avoid conflict with a program on PBS).

Meredith won an Emmy Award as Outstanding Supporting Actor in a Comedy or Drama Special for the 1977 television film Tail Gunner Joe, a fictionalized study of U.S. Senator Joseph McCarthy, the anticommunist politician active in the 1950s. He was cast as crusading lawyer Joseph Welch.

In 1992, Meredith narrated The Chaplin Puzzle, a television documentary that provides a rare insight into Charles Chaplin's work, circa 1914, at Keystone Studios and Essanay, where Chaplin developed his Tramp character. Coincidentally, Meredith married actress Paulette Goddard in 1944 following her divorce from Chaplin.

Military service 
In 1942, Meredith enlisted in the United States Army Air Forces during World War II, reaching the rank of captain. After transferring to the Office of War Information, he made training and education films for America's armed forces.
In 1943 he performed in the USAAF's recruiting short The Rear Gunner and the U.S. Army training film A Welcome to Britain for troops heading to the UK in preparation for the liberation of Europe.
He was released from duty in 1944 to work on the movie The Story of G.I. Joe, in which he played the war correspondent Ernie Pyle. He was discharged from the USAAF in 1945.

Other work
Meredith also performed voice-over work. He provided the narration for the war film A Walk in the Sun (1945). As a nod to his longtime association with original Twilight Zone series, he served as narrator for the 1983 film based on the series. He was a TV commercial voice for such clients as Bulova, Honda, Pioneer, Stokely-Van Camp, United Airlines, and Freakies breakfast cereal. He also provided the narration for the short film Works Of Calder, a 1949-50 film by Herbert Matter which featured a musical soundtrack by the composer John Cage.

He supplied the narration for the 1974–75 ABC Saturday morning series Korg: 70,000 B.C. and was the voice of Puff in the series of animated adaptations of the Peter, Paul, and Mary song Puff, the Magic Dragon. In the mid-1950s, he was one of four narrators of the NBC and syndicated public affairs program, The Big Story (1949–58), which focused on courageous journalists. In 1991, he narrated a track on The Chieftains' album of traditional Christmas music and carols, The Bells of Dublin.

He acted in the Kenny G music video of "Have Yourself a Merry Little Christmas", which was released in 1994. He played the main character, a projectionist at a movie theater.

His last role before his death was the portrayal of both Hamilton Wofford and Covington Wofford characters in the 1996 video game Ripper by Take-Two Interactive. Meredith was considered to play the Penguin's father in the 1992 Tim Burton film Batman Returns, but illness prevented him from appearing and the role was taken by Paul Reubens.

Personal life and death
Meredith was married four times. His first wife, Helen Derby Merrien Burgess — the daughter of American Cyanamid president Harry L. Derby — committed suicide in 1940, nearly five years after their divorce. His next two wives, Margaret Perry and Paulette Goddard, were actresses; Goddard suffered a miscarriage in 1944. Meredith's last marriage, to Kaja Sundsten, lasted 46 years and produced two children, Jonathan (a musician) and Tala (a painter).

Meredith was a lifelong Democrat and frequent donor to the party. He wrote in his 1994 autobiography So Far, So Good  that he had violent mood swings caused by cyclothymia, a form of bipolar disorder.

On September 9, 1997, Meredith died at age 89 from complications of Alzheimer's disease and melanoma, and his remains were cremated.

Awards and honors
Meredith was twice nominated for the Academy Award for Best Supporting Actor, in 1976 for Rocky, and in 1975 for The Day of the Locust, for which he also received a Golden Globe Award nomination for Best Supporting Actor in a Motion Picture. That performance brought him a BAFTA Award nomination.

Meredith won a Primetime Emmy Award for Supporting Actor in 1977 for Tail Gunner Joe, and was nominated for the same award the next year for The Last Hurrah, a remake of the film starring Spencer Tracy. He was nominated for Best Supporting Actor by the Academy of Science Fiction, Fantasy and Horror Films three times, in 1978, 1979, and 1982, and won the last two times, for Magic and Clash of the Titans.

In 1962, Meredith won a Best Supporting Actor award from the National Board of Review, for Advise & Consent, and in 1985 he was nominated for a CableAce Award for his performance in Answers.

Meredith received a Special Tony Award in 1960 for directing A Thurber Carnival.

For his contributions to the motion picture industry, Meredith has a star on the Hollywood Walk of Fame. For his onstage contributions, he was inducted into the American Theater Hall of Fame.

A  park was named after him in Pomona, New York, and he provided the funding to incorporate the village.

In 1977, he received an honorary doctorate degree from Upper Iowa University in Fayette, Iowa.

Filmography

Film

Television

Video games

Theatre

Radio appearances

References

External links

 
 
 
 
 Burgess Meredith as the Penguin
 Burgess Meredith Park
 Photos of Burgess Meredith in "Story of G.I. Joe", 1944 by Ned Scott

1907 births
1997 deaths
20th-century American male actors
American film directors
American male film actors
American male journalists
American male radio actors
American male stage actors
American male television actors
American male voice actors
Methodists from California
American people of Canadian descent
American people of English descent
American theatre directors
Amherst College alumni
Articles containing video clips
California Democrats
Deaths from Alzheimer's disease
Deaths from melanoma
Deaths from cancer in California
Deaths from dementia in California
Journalists from New York City
Male actors from Cleveland
Ohio Democrats
Outstanding Performance by a Supporting Actor in a Miniseries or Movie Primetime Emmy Award winners
People with bipolar disorder
Special Tony Award recipients
United States Army Air Forces officers
United States Army Air Forces personnel of World War II
People of the United States Office of War Information
Methodists from New York (state)
Methodists from Ohio